This is a list of Ministers of environment of Russia.

Russian SFSR

Chairman of the State Committee for Nature Protection

Chairman of the State Committee for Ecology and Nature Management

Minister of Ecology and Nature Management

Minister of Ecology and Natural Resources

Russian Federation

Minister of Ecology and Natural Resources

Minister of Environmental Protection and Natural Resources

Chairman of the State Committee for Environmental Protection

Ministers of Natural Resources

Ministers of Natural Resources and Ecology

External links
 List of Russian ministers (rulers.org)
 Ministry of Natural Resources and Ecology official website

Environment
Environment
Russia